Headhunter is a 2009 Danish thriller film directed by Rumle Hammerich.

Cast 
 Lars Mikkelsen - Martin Vinge
 Charlotte Munck - Nina
 Burkhard Forstreuter - Christian Vestergaard
 Søren Spanning - Vestergaards stemme
 Charlotte Fich - Pernille
 Troels Lyby - Troels

References

External links 

2009 thriller films
2009 films
Danish thriller films
2000s Danish-language films